Viggo Sundmoen (born 24 April 1954) is a Norwegian former footballer from Os, Hedmark, who played for Rosenborg (1978–81) and HamKam (1982–85). He became Rosenborg's top scorer in the 1979 season with seven and 1980 season with eleven goals. Sundmoen was known for his great speed and was thus given the nickname the Os Express.

References

Norwegian footballers
Rosenborg BK players
Hamarkameratene players
Eliteserien players
People from Os, Innlandet
1954 births
Living people
Association football forwards
Sportspeople from Innlandet